Debrii is the alias of Deborah Fields, a fictional character appearing in American comic books published by Marvel Comics. Created by writer Zeb Wells and artist Skottie Young, she debuted in New Warriors vol. 3 #4. Little is known about her at this time. She is a superhero who avoided being killed in the opening shots of Marvel's Civil War by not reuniting with the team after their reality show was cancelled the first time in New Warriors vol. 3 #6.

Fictional character biography

New Warriors
Debrii was introduced by the New Warriors' TV producer, Ashley, and so was the only member of Night Thrasher's revised team to have not been hand-picked by him. The TV company's board of directors felt that there was no "friction" in the current team — they all liked each other too much — and that the show would get better ratings if an unknown quantity was added to the team. Debrii's abrasive, antagonistic personality was perfect in this regard; she did not get on well with any of the team members, frequently making snide comments about Microbe's relatively useless powers and constantly arguing with Namorita.

Civil War
Debrii was one of the former Warriors who felt the sting of the growing anti-New-Warriors movement when her secret identity was "outed" online through a New Warriors hate site, after which her car was overturned and set on fire.

After the death of Black Goliath at the hands of a cloned Thor, Debrii was compelled to become involved and joined up with Captain America's Secret Avengers.

Initiative
Deborah has been identified as one of the 142 registered superheroes who are a part of the Initiative program. She was one of the former Warriors that was accused of Gauntlet's beating. In truth it was her fellow recruit Slapstick who performed the crime, he was sick of Gauntlet insulting his dead friends.

Debrii later quit the Initiative, along with Justice, Rage, and Slapstick forming the a team called Counter Force. She later returned to Camp Hammond with the team, now calling themselves the New Warriors again, and battled Ragnarok, the clone of Thor.

Debrii eventually quits the team, and leaves the country to go into hiding with Heavy Hitters members Nonstop and Telemetry. After the fall of Osborn, she is no longer a fugitive but remains in Paris, working as the snarky judge of a TV talent competition, "Superpouvoir."

Fear Itself
During the Fear Itself storyline, Debrii appears at a meeting held by Prodigy regarding magical hammers that have crashed into the Earth. Debrii and other heroes then battle Juggernaut, who was transformed into Kuurth: Breaker of Stone, in Las Vegas, Nevada. She and Rage then appear rescuing survivors and help the team in their battle against Thor Girl, who had recovered her designate powers.

Powers and abilities
Debrii is described as a "low level telekinetic magnet". She is able to move masses of huge objects in her immediate vicinity at will, and is capable of manipulating many such objects at one time. She can use any "debris" around her to defend herself from attacks, or to attack her enemies. During the New Warriors' battle with the Mad Thinker's Intellectual Robots, she took control of a pile of scrap metal, crafting a shell in the form of a large monster around her body, and manipulating this creation as a weapon.

In the New Warriors series where they star on a reality television show Debrii is actually considered a low level electromagnetic telekinetic. Although she is able to move massive amounts of debris she cannot lift anything really heavy with her powers. She can also levitate herself a little (probably not faster as she can comfortably walk), but cannot really fly.

Other versions

Age of X
In the Age of X reality, a memory experience by Tempo revealed that a woman resembling Debrii was captured by the Sapien League and paraded down the street as a dangerous mutant. However, since the anti-mutant forces of this reality also targeted the non-mutant Spider-Man as part of their anti-mutant purge, this is not confirmation that Debrii is a mutant, even if the unnamed woman in Tempo's memories is Debrii.

In other media
Debrii was set to appear in the Marvel Television live-action New Warriors TV series, portrayed by Kate Comer before it was cancelled.

References

External links
 
 
 Debrii at World of Black Heroes

Fictional African-American people
Marvel Comics female superheroes
Marvel Comics superheroes
Marvel Comics telekinetics